Jerry Bryant is an American folksinger specializing in maritime music. In addition to performing traditional songs, he also has written songs in a traditional style.  Of his original songs, The Ballad of Harbo and Samuelsen is among his best known and has been recorded by several other performers including William Pint and Felicia Dale, Forebitter, and Rick Lee (of Solomon's Seal).

Instruments:

 Guitar
 Concertina
 Ukulele
 Bones
 Banjo

Recordings:

Roast Beef of Old England, songs of the British Navy in the 19th century (companion to Patrick O'Brian's novels)
The Ballad of Harbo and Samuelsen, traditional songs and new compositions
Salty Dick's Uncensored Sailor Songs, traditional bawdy songs (recorded under pseudonym "Salty Dick")

References

Notes

General References
Official website
YouTube video of Jerry Bryant performing original song The Ballad of Harbo and Samuelsen.
"Three solo folksingers to perform as a trio." by Keith J. Connor.  From The Republican Entertainment Desk, Tuesday 9 December 2008, 2:11 PM, found on Masslive.com 
Bio on website for 2008 Portsmouth Maritime Folk Festival 
Bio on website for 2007 Chicago Maritime Festival 
Bio on website for 2002 Hull, MA Summer Shanty Concert 

Maritime music
American folk musicians
American male singer-songwriters
American singer-songwriters
Year of birth missing (living people)
Place of birth missing (living people)
Living people